Look Who's Talking is a 1989 film starring John Travolta and Kirstie Alley.

Look Who's Talking may also refer to:

 Look Who's Talking (album), a 1994 album by Dr. Alban
 "Look Who's Talking" (song), a 1994 song by Dr. Alban
 Look Who's Talking (horse), a racehorse

See also
 Look Who's Talking Too, a 1990 film 
 Look Who's Talking Now, a 1993 film